is a Rinzai temple in Hakata, Fukuoka, Japan. It was founded by Enni-Ben'en with support from Xie Guo Ming, a Chinese merchant, and construction was completed in 1242.

Monument to the introduction of udon and soba

The founding priest of the temple, Enni-Ben'en went to China in 1235, mastered Zen Buddhism through a great hardship and came back to Japan in 1241. Besides the teachings of Buddhism, he brought back to Japan a variety of cultural features from China. The production methods of udon, soba, yokan and manjū are especially famous among them.

Hakata Sennen Gate

The Hakata Sennen Gate, the new symbol of the Hakata area, was completed at the entrance of Jōtenji-dori Avenue on March 28, 2014. Height and length are each approximately 8 metres. It was named in the hope of prosperity for a thousand years in the future of the city of Hakata.

References

External links
Yokanavi.com

Buddhist temples in Fukuoka Prefecture
Rinzai school
Buildings and structures in Fukuoka
Tourist attractions in Fukuoka
Hachiman faith
Religious buildings and structures completed in 1242
13th-century Buddhist temples